Broecker Bröcker or Brocker may refer to:

David Broecker (born 1961), American life sciences executive 
Tom Broecker, American actor and costume designer
Wallace Smith Broecker (1931–2019), American earth scientist 
Patricia Brocker (born 1966), German football player

See also
Broeckers